Dragonfly is a suspense-mystery novel by American writer Dean Koontz, released under the pseudonym K. R. Dwyer in 1975. The book has not been re-issued since.

Plot summary
An innocent man has been turned into a walking time bomb.  In 4 days, he will kill 100,000 people.

References

Novels by Dean Koontz
1975 American novels
American thriller novels
Works published under a pseudonym